
Taylorville may refer to the following places:

Australia
Taylorville, South Australia, a locality
Taylorville Station (reserve), a protected area in South Australia
Taylorville Station, South Australia, a locality

Canada
 Taylorville, Alberta

New Zealand
 Taylorville, New Zealand

United States
 Taylorville, California
 Taylorville, Illinois
 Taylorville, Indiana
 Taylorville, West Virginia

See also
 Taylorsville (disambiguation)